Botteghe Oscure was a literary journal that was published and edited in Rome by Marguerite Caetani (Princess di Bassiano) from 1948 to 1960.

History and profile
Botteghe Oscure was established in 1948. The magazine was named after via delle Botteghe Oscure (Latin: Ad Apothecas Obscuras), where the editorial office was located; during the Middle Ages the street's "dark shops" came to be installed under the dark arches of the Circus Flaminius (illustration of a street sign).

The review was published twice a year with poetry and prose in five languages (Italian, French and English, and alternating issues featuring German and Spanish-language segments. It was distributed in the United States through Farrar, Straus & Young and the Gotham Book Mart.

Giorgio Bassani was an editor. Later Eugene Walter moved from Paris to Rome to edit the magazine for Marguerite Chapin Caetani who also founded and edited the magazine. The publication of the magazine ended in 1960.

See also
 List of magazines in Italy

References

External links

1948 establishments in Italy
1960 disestablishments in Italy
Biannual magazines
Defunct literary magazines published in Italy
Italian-language magazines
Magazines established in 1948
Magazines disestablished in 1960
Magazines published in Rome
Multilingual magazines